-ism is a suffix in many English words, originally derived from the Ancient Greek suffix , and reaching English through the Latin , and the French . It means "taking side with" or "imitation of", and is often used to describe philosophies, theories, religions, social movements, artistic movements and behaviors. It is typically added to nouns.

The concept of an -ism may resemble that of a grand narrative.

History 
The first recorded usage of the suffix ism as a separate word in its own right was in 1680. By the nineteenth century it was being used by Thomas Carlyle to signify a pre-packaged ideology. It was later used in this sense by such writers as Julian Huxley and George Bernard Shaw. In the United States of the mid-nineteenth century, the phrase "the isms" was used as a collective derogatory term to lump together the radical social reform movements of the day (such as slavery abolitionism, feminism, alcohol prohibitionism, Fourierism, pacifism, Technoism, early socialism, etc.) and various spiritual or religious movements considered non-mainstream by the standards of the time (such as transcendentalism, spiritualism or "spirit rapping", Mormonism, the Oneida movement often accused of "free love", etc.).  Southerners often prided themselves on the American South being free from all of these pernicious "Isms" (except for alcohol temperance campaigning, which was compatible with a traditional Protestant focus on individual morality).  So on September 5 and 9, 1856, the Examiner newspaper of Richmond, Virginia, ran editorials on "Our Enemies, the Isms and their Purposes", while in 1858 Parson Brownlow called for a "Missionary Society of the South, for the Conversion of the Freedom Shriekers, Spiritualists, Free-lovers, Fourierites, and Infidel Reformers of the North" (see The Freedom-of-thought Struggle in the Old South by Clement Eaton).  In the present day, it appears in the title of a standard survey of political thought, Today's Isms by William Ebenstein, first published in the 1950s, and now in its 11th edition.

In 2004, the Oxford English Dictionary added two new draft definitions of -isms to reference their relationship to words that convey injustice:
 "Forming nouns with the sense 'belief in the superiority of one—over another'; as racism, sexism, speciesism, etc."
 "Forming nouns with the sense 'discrimination or prejudice against on the basis of—'; as ageism, bodyism, heightism, faceism, lookism, sizeism, weightism, etc."

In December 2015, Merriam-Webster Dictionary declared -ism to be the Word of the Year.

See also
For examples of the use of -ism as a suffix:
 List of philosophies
 Glossary of philosophy
 List of political ideologies
 List of art movements
 Discrimination#Types of discrimination

References

Further reading
 Today's Isms: Socialism, Capitalism, Fascism, Communism, Libertarianism by Alan Ebenstein, William Ebenstein and Edwin Fogelman (11th ed, Pearson, 1999)
 Isms and Ologies: 453 Difficult Doctrines You've Always Pretended to Understand by Arthur Goldwag (Quercus, 2007) ranges from Abolitionism to Zoroastrianism.
 Isms: Understanding Art by Stephen Little (A & C Black, 2004), one of a series of similar titles including ... Architecture, ... Modern Art, ... Fashion and ... Religions.
 The Ism Book: A Field Guide to Philosophy by Peter Saint-Andre.

English suffixes
Belief